March 28 Stadium is a multi-purpose stadium in Benghazi, Libya, also known as Sports City Stadium. It is a part of Benghazi Sports City, used mostly for football matches and also has athletics facilities.  The stadium holds 65,000 spectators. It is sometimes used by the Libya national football team, although it is not as popular as  the Tripoli Stadium.

The name of the stadium commemorates 28 March, in which British Forces were asked to relinquish their military base rights in Libya and leave the country.

Along with then-called June 11 Stadium, the 28 March Stadium hosted many games, including a semi-final, of the 1982 African Cup of Nations held in Libya.

New stadium

In 2013, the stadium had been closed and demolition work had begun for the construction of a new stadium. The new stadium will be an 85,000 all seater stadium. Thomas Phifer and Partners, a New York-based architectural firm won the international competition for its design. The construction work is part of a general restructuring of the entire Medina al-Riyadhia (Sports City) site in honour of the Libyan multi-millionaire owner Musbah for saving the club from all its debts. Work was expected to be finished in time for Libya's hosting of the 2017 Africa Cup of Nations, until the tournament was cancelled in August 2014. While construction has been taking place, Benghazi's football clubs have been using the Martyrs of February Stadium.

References

External links

Photo  at worldstadiums.com 
Photo of demolition and construction work at the site

Football venues in Libya
Sports venues in Libya
Athletics (track and field) venues in Libya
Multi-purpose stadiums in Libya
Buildings and structures in Benghazi